Jaime Sánchez Fernández (born 20 March 1973), sometimes known simply as Jaime, is a Spanish former professional footballer who played as a defensive midfielder.

Club career
Sánchez was born in Madrid. After starting professionally with a modest team, RSD Alcalá (with whom he achieved a 1992 promotion to Segunda División B), he joined Real Madrid, playing three seasons for its reserve sides.

Sánchez first appeared in La Liga for Racing de Santander, on loan, being a mainstay during 1996–97 and subsequently returning home to help Madrid to the following campaign's UEFA Champions League, coming in the 82nd minute of their 1–0 win against Juventus F.C. and remaining two years with the club.

Subsequently, Sánchez signed for Deportivo de La Coruña and, prior to the team's signing of Aldo Duscher, would appear significantly in the 2000 league conquest, the first-ever for the Galicians. However, it would be the only season he would play for Depor, being consecutively loaned for the duration of his link, including twice to German Bundesliga's Hannover 96.

Sánchez retired in 2006 at the age of 33, after one-year stints with Albacete Balompié and Racing de Ferrol – the latter in Segunda División – both ended in relegation.

Honours
Real Madrid
Supercopa de España: 1997
UEFA Champions League: 1997–98

Deportivo
La Liga: 1999–2000

References

External links

1973 births
Living people
Footballers from Madrid
Spanish footballers
Association football midfielders
La Liga players
Segunda División players
Segunda División B players
Tercera División players
RSD Alcalá players
Real Madrid C footballers
Real Madrid Castilla footballers
Real Madrid CF players
Racing de Santander players
Deportivo de La Coruña players
CD Tenerife players
Albacete Balompié players
Racing de Ferrol footballers
Bundesliga players
Hannover 96 players
UEFA Champions League winning players
Spanish expatriate footballers
Expatriate footballers in Germany
Spanish expatriate sportspeople in Germany